Atanas Kirilov Tarev (born 31 January 1958 in Plovdiv Province) is a retired pole vaulter from Bulgaria. He won a bronze medal at the inaugural World Championships in 1983, and won the European Indoor Championships in 1986. The same year he jumped 5.80 metres, a personal best.

International competitions

References

Sports Reference
Track and Field Statistics

1958 births
Living people
People from Plovdiv Province
Bulgarian male pole vaulters
Olympic athletes of Bulgaria
Athletes (track and field) at the 1980 Summer Olympics
Athletes (track and field) at the 1988 Summer Olympics
World Athletics Championships athletes for Bulgaria
World Athletics Championships medalists
European Athletics Championships medalists